José Ángel Ibáñez Montes (31 May 1950 – 30 September  2011) was a Mexican educator and politician affiliated with the Institutional Revolutionary Party. He served as Deputy of the LIX Legislature of the Mexican Congress as a plurinominal representative.

References

1950 births
2011 deaths
Politicians from Durango
Members of the Chamber of Deputies (Mexico)
Institutional Revolutionary Party politicians
Members of the Congress of Durango
20th-century Mexican politicians
21st-century Mexican politicians
Deputies of the LIX Legislature of Mexico